In Greek religion and mythology, Theandrios ("God-Man") or Theandrates (Θεανδράτης) is a deity that was worshipped in towns and villages around Mount Hermon by North Arabian tribes of pre-Islamic Arabia. Theandrios is evidenced by a dedication to a male god found at Beit Rime, Syria and it is supposed that the Greek name was imposed on a previous god of the region. He has been considered the Arabian version of similar "God-man" deities such as Dionysus, Herakles/Hercules, Mithras, Krishna and Jesus.

See also
 Temples of Mount Hermon
 Theanthropos, a Christian title for Jesus pertaining to the hypostatic union.

References

Arab history
Arabian gods
Greek gods
Greek mythology
Mount Hermon